Passiflora lutea, commonly known as yellow passionflower, is a flowering perennial vine in the family Passifloraceae, native to the central and eastern United States. The vine has three-lobed leaves and small, yellowish-green, fringed flowers that appear in the summer, followed by green fruit that turn almost black at maturity. It grows in moist to wet habitats.

Description
P. lutea is a perennial, herbaceous, climbing or trailing, unbranched vine that can reach  in length. Curled, springlike tendrils emerging from leaf axils help the vine to climb on structures or other vegetation. Leaves have smooth (entire) margins and are alternate on the stem. The upper surface of the leaves is dark green, and may be mottled with splotches of lighter green. In the north of its range, it is deciduous. 

Each fruit contains up to 10 seeds, which are brown, pointed at each end, and have a textured surface.

Similar species
P. lutea is very similar to Passiflora suberosa (corkystem passionflower), differentiated by the leaves, which are more variable and generally have deeper lobes in P. suberosa, and the stems, which are corky or winged in P. suberosa. Also, P. suberosa has a more limited range, occurring in Texas and Florida and parts of Latin America. Another similar species is Menispermum canadense (Canadian moonflower), whose leaves are a different shape, with three to seven lobes instead of just three. Also, the fruit of M. canadense grows in clusters and each berry has a single crescent shaped seed.

Etymology
The genus name Passiflora comes from the Italian word "passio", or suffering, based on a association of the flower parts to the crucifixion of Jesus Christ. The species name luteo is from the Latin word for "yellow", due to the color of the flowers.

Distribution and habitat
P. lutea is native in the United States from Pennsylvania west to Kansas, and south to Florida and Texas. It is the northernmost species of Passiflora, occurring slightly further north than P. incarnata, and tolerant of winter temperatures down to −15 °C, and even −30 °C for short periods.

P. lutea grows in bright shade to sunny places with moist, rich soil, such as open woodlands and low alluvial ground.

Conservation
Passiflora lutea is considered an endangered species in Pennsylvania.

Ecology
Yellow passionflower is often good for butterfly gardens, as it is a host for Gulf fritillaries, julia butterflies (Dryas julia), and zebra longwings (Heliconius charitonius). It is also the only pollen source used by an unusual specialist bee, Anthemurgus passiflorae, which is the sole member of its genus; this rare bee is unusual in that despite its obligate relationship with the plant (oligolecty), it rarely pollinates it.

References

lutea
Flora of the United States
Plants described in 1753
Taxa named by Carl Linnaeus